Sigrid Andrea Bernardo is a Filipino film director, screenwriter, producer, and actress best known for directing Kita Kita (2017).

Career
Bernardo's film Kita Kita, starring Alessandra de Rossi and Empoy Marquez and set in Sapporo, Japan was deemed a sleeper hit. In its third week it reached , making it the highest-grossing Philippine independent film. It had its world premiere in Japan at the 12th Osaka Asian Film Festival in March 2017 before expanding to a wider release in the Philippines on July 19, 2017 to highly positive reviews. In 2017, Kita Kita was selected as the best romantic-comedy film in the last 25 years, as polled by CNN Philippines.

Her short films are Babae (2005), Little  (2009), Au Revoir Philip (2010), and  Ang Paghihintay sa Bulong (2012).

Filmography

References

Filipino directors
Filipino film producers
Filipino screenwriters
Living people
Year of birth missing (living people)